Guillermina 'Gigi' Lozano is an American geneticist. She is a professor at University of Texas MD Anderson Cancer Center. Lozano is recognised for her studies of the p53 tumour suppressor pathway, characterising the protein as a regulator of gene expression (transcription factor).

Early life and education 
Lozano was born in East Chicago, Indiana, the daughter of Mexican immigrants. She attended a private Catholic high school, Bishop Noll, up until her senior year, when her family moved to McAllen, Texas.

Lozano completed a Bachelor of Science in biology and mathematics, graduating Magna Cum Laude, at Pan American University (now University of Texas Rio Grande Valley) in 1979. She earned a doctor of philosophy in biochemistry from Rutgers University and University of Medicine and Dentistry of New Jersey in 1986. Lozano's dissertation was titled Isolation, characterization and analysis of the gene encoding the Alpha 2 type IX collagen polypeptide. She completed postgraduate training in molecular biology at Princeton University from 1985 to 1987.

Career and research 
Lozano is Professor and Chair of the Department of Genetics at University of Texas MD Anderson Cancer Center. She is also a professor at University of Texas MD Anderson Cancer Center UTHealth Graduate School of Biomedical Sciences.

Lozano is recognised for her studies of the p53 tumour suppressor pathway, from characterising p53 as a transcriptional activator to revealing the importance of two inhibitors of p53, Mdm2 and Mdm4. Her lab has generated dozens of mouse models of p53 to explore effects of mutations in this tumor-suppressing protein on tumorogeneis.

Awards and honours 
Lozano is a member of the National Academy of Sciences, National Academy of Medicine, Academy of Medicine, Engineering and Science of Texas.

Awards:

 2021 - elected to Fellows of the American Association for Cancer Research (AACR)
 2020 - elected as a member of the American Academy of Arts and Sciences
 2018 - E.E Just Lecture Award, The American Society for Cell Biology. The award recognises outstanding scientific achievement by an underrepresented minority scientist.
 2017 - Elected as a member of the National Academy of Sciences
 2014 - Elected as a member of the National Academy of Sciences
 2013 - AACR-Women in Cancer Research Charlotte Friend Memorial Lectureship. The award is presented by the American Association for Cancer Research to an outstanding scientist who has made significant contributions to the field of cancer and who has, through leader or by example, furthered the advancement of women in science.
 2011 - AACR-Minorities in Cancer Research Jane Cook Wright Memorial Lectureship, an award that recognises an outstanding scientist who has, through leadership or by example, furthered the advancement of minority investigators in cancer research.

References 

Living people
20th-century American women scientists
21st-century American women scientists
American geneticists
American women geneticists
University of Texas MD Anderson Cancer Center faculty
University of Texas–Pan American alumni
Rutgers University alumni
University of Medicine and Dentistry of New Jersey alumni
Members of the National Academy of Medicine
Members of the United States National Academy of Sciences
Year of birth missing (living people)